Drawdown cover ratio is one of the key terms in project finance funding agreements.

It compares the projected maximum debt outstanding with the forecast net present value of the project cash flows during the term of the loan.

References

Loans
Business terms
Valuation (finance)